Arcturus
Aspera Hiems Symfonia
Aura Noir
Black Thrash Attack
Borknagar
Borknagar
The Olden Domain
Dodheimsgard
Kronet Til Konge
Monumental Possession
Einherjer
Odin Owns Ye All
Emperor
Wrath of the Tyrant
In the Nightside Eclipse
Anthems to the Welkin at Dusk
Gorgoroth
Pentagram
Antichrist
Under the Sign of Hell
Kampfar
Mellom Skogkledde Aaser
Katatonia
Dance of December Souls
Brave Murder Day
Discouraged Ones
Mayhem
Live in Leipzig
De Mysteriis Dom Sathanas
Old Man's Child
Born of the Flickering
The Pagan Prosperity
Ill-Natured Spiritual Invasion
Opeth
Orchid
Morningrise
My Arms, Your Hearse
Ophthalamia
Via Dolorosa
Rotting Christ
Thy Mighty Contract
Triarchy of Lost Lovers
A Dead Poem
Sacramentum
The Coming of Chaos
Satyricon
Nemesis Divina
Ulver
Nattens Madrigal

Century Black